Hampar State is a village in the Surendranagar District of the state of Gujarat in India. And It was ruled by shivsinhji jhala

Hampar is surrounded by the Lakhtar, Surendranagar, Wadhwan and Muli talukas.

References 

Villages in Surendranagar district